Venu Nagavally (16 April 1949 – 10 September 2010) was an Indian actor, screenwriter and director best known for his work in Malayalam film industry. He has directed 12 films. Son of writer, commentator, and broadcaster Nagavally R. S. Kurup, Venu has acted in about fifty films, directed films such as Sukhamo Devi (1986), Sarvakalashala (1987), Lal Salam (1990), and Aye Auto (1990), Aayirappara (1993) and scripted the commercially successful Kilukkam (1991). Venu Nagavally died at Thiruvananthapuram on 9 September 2010.

Early life 
Venu Nagavally was born on 16 April 1949 as the son of the noted play writer Nagavally R. S. Kurup and Rajamma. Ramachandran, Vasundara and Lalithambika are his siblings. He completed his education from Government Model Boys Higher Secondary School, Thiruvananthapuram and University College Trivandrum. He had a bachelor's degree in Politics and a Diploma in journalism. Venu Nagavally died at KIMS hospital in Thiruvananthapuram on 9 September 2010 due to liver cirrhosis. He was 61 at the time of his death, and was cremated with full state honours at Santhikavadam crematorium on the same day. He is survived by his wife Meera and son Vivek.

Career 
Venu started his career as an announcer in Akashvani. He later sung a song in the movie Chottanikkara Amma (1976) but was noticed only in 1978 when he acted in the movie Ulkkadal (1979) directed by K. G. George, thus starting his acting career in movies. His noted movies as an actor are Shalini Ente Koottukari, Meenamasathile Sooryan, Pakshe, and Chillu.

Venu's first movie as a director was Sukhamo Devi (1986) which he himself describes as his own tragical love story. Later he directed the superhit movies Lal Salam, Aey Auto, Aayirappara, Rakthasaakshikal Zindabad etc.  Lal Salaam and Rakthasaakshikal Zindabad revolved around the lives of the early Communist leaders of Kerala. It was his directorial projects like "Sughamo devi", "Sarvakalashala", "Aey Auto" and "Lal Salam" that cemented Mohanlal's status as a superstar, in the late 1980s. Venu has also written scripts for a few movies including the Priyadarshan directed blockbuster movie Kilukkam. His first movie as a script writer was Ee Ganam Marakkumo.

His oeuvre also had a strain of his left leanings; in addition to acting in films like Meenamasathile Sooryan (about the Kayyur revolt) and heading the production wing of a pro-left television channel, two of the films he directed – Lal Salam (1990) and Raksthasakhikal Zindabad (1998) – were an introspective look at the rise and fall of communist ideals. Venu examines these issues by dealing with the cracks in political movements, its hopes and later degeneration, create in human relationships.

The movies for which he has sung songs include Chillu, Ente Ammu Ninte Thulasi Avarude Chakki, Oru Painkilikatha out of which the song "Kochu Chakkarachi Pettu" from the movie Ente Ammu, Ninte Thulasi, Avarude Chakki became quite popular.

Filmography

Actor

 Caribbeans (2013) as Joseph (posthumously)
College Days (2010)
Bhagyadevatha (2009) as Anto
Roudram (2008) as Doctor
Indraneelam (2007)
Heartbeats (2007)
Anchil Oral Arjunan (2007) as Padmanabhan
Baba Kalyani (2006) as V. Ninan
Photographer (2006)
Out of Syllabus (2006)
Pathaka (2006) as Shekharji
Pauran (2005) as Chief Minister
Deepangal Sakshi (2005) as Advocate
Kaazhcha (2004) as Magistrate
Sathyam (2004) as Chief Minister
Wanted (2004) as Krishnadas
Harikrishnans (1998) as Vishwambharan
Minnaram (1994) as Baby (Bobby's elder brother)
Pavam IA Ivachan (1994) as Main Villain
Pakshe (1994) as Unniyettan
Devadas (1989) as Devadas
Kali karyamaai: Crime Branch (1989)
Moonnam Pakkam (1988)
Theertham (1987)
Arinjo Ariyatheyo (1987)
Vartha (1986) as Devan
Meenamaasathile Sooryan (1986) as Appu
Oru Katha Oru Nunnakkatha (1986)
Sukhamo Devi (1986)
Sunil Vayassu 20 (1986) as Jayakumar
Adhyayam Onnu Muthal (1985) as Rameshan Nair
Ente Ammu Ninte Thulasi Avarude Chakki (1985) as Shakthi
Meenamasathile Sooryan (1985) as Matathil Appu
Uyarukm Njan Nadaake (1985)
Oru Kudakeezhil (1985) as Unni
Puzhayozhukum Vazhi (1985) as Hari
Thirakal (1984)
Oru Painkili Kadha (1984)
Ente Nandinikutty (1984)
Thirakal (1984) as Balan
Swantham Sarika (1984) as Murali
Velichamillatha Veedhi (1984)
Arante Mulla Kochu Mulla (1984) as Joy
Panchavadi Palam (1984) as Jeemudhavahanan
Adaminte Variyellu (1983) as Gopi
April 18 (1983) as Advocate Thomachan
Lekhayude Maranam Oru Flashback (1983)
Prasnam Gurutharam (1983) as Venu
Omanathinkal (1983)
Oru Swakaryam (1983)
Kathi (1983)
Rugma (1983)
Parasparam (1983) as Vishwanathan
Premnazirne Kanmanilla (1983)
Eenam (1983)
Chillu (1982) as Ananthu
Ithiri Neram Othiri Karyam (1982)
Yavanika (1982) as Joseph Kollapally
Kilukilukkam (1982)
Kattile Pattu (1982) as Devan
Oru Vilipadakale (1982) as Vishnu
Kolangal (1981) as Cheriyan
Archana Teacher (1981)
Tharattu (1981)
 Kalopasana (1981)
Maniyan Pilla Adhava Maniyan Pilla (1981) as RahimAkalangalil Abhayam (1980)Kalika (1980) as SadhanIshtamanu Pakshe (1980)Aniyatha Valakkal (1980) as Ravi ShankarShalini Ente Koottukari (1980) as PrabhaUlkkadal (1978) as Rahulan (First film)Kaamalola (1977)

As director

Writer
Bharya Swantham Suhruthu (2009) (screenplay)
Vishnu (1994) (screenplay and dialogue)
Aayirappara (1993) (writer)
Kalippattam (1993) (writer)
Kilukkam (1991) (writer)
Kizhakkunarum Pakshi (1991) (screenplay and dialogue)
Aye Auto (1990) (writer)
Ardham (1989) (writer)
Sarvakalasala (1987) (screenplay and dialogue)
Sukhamodevi (1986) (writer)
Gayathri Devi Entae Amma (1985) (Screenplay)
Guruji Oru Vaakku (1985)
Daivathae Orthu (1985)
Ee Gaanam Marakkumo (1978) (screenplay)

Television
Ente Manasaputhri (Asianet)
Kadamattath Kathanar (Asianet)
Mizhi thurakumbol (Surya TV)
 " Thinkalum Tharakangalum " (Amrita TV (TV channel)
Marubhumiyil pookkalam
Ekaakini
Arohanam
Chitta
Tanichu
Ohari
Kurukhetram
Gandhari
Mangalyam
Manaswini
Talolam
Ellam Mayajaalam

References

External links
http://en.msidb.org/displayProfile.php?category=actors&artist=Venu%20Nagavally&limit=59

Male actors from Thiruvananthapuram
Malayalam film directors
Malayalam screenwriters
2010 deaths
1949 births
University College Thiruvananthapuram alumni
Male actors in Malayalam cinema
Film directors from Thiruvananthapuram
20th-century Indian male actors
21st-century Indian male actors
Indian male film actors
20th-century Indian dramatists and playwrights
21st-century Indian dramatists and playwrights
Screenwriters from Thiruvananthapuram
20th-century Indian film directors
21st-century Indian film directors
Indian male television actors
Male actors in Malayalam television